Cavalo (Portuguese "horse") may refer to:

Cavalo, Dienison Gomes do Carmo (born 1991), Brazilian footballer
Roberto Cavalo (born 1963), Brazilian footballer
Cavalo (album), a 2013 album by Rodrigo Amarante

See also
Bife a cavalo, or bife com ovo a cavalo, traditional dish in Portugal and Brazil
Cavalo Dinheiro, 2014 Portuguese film
Cavalo de Aço, 1973 Brazilian telenovela